John F. Carroll is an Irish former trade union leader.  He was vice-president of the Irish Transport and General Workers' Union from 1969 to 1981, when he became the union's president until its merger in 1990 with the Federated Workers' Union of Ireland to form the new Services, Industrial, Professional and Technical Union (SIPTU).

Carroll also served briefly as a senator. In 1981, he was nominated by the Taoiseach, Garret FitzGerald as a member of the 15th Seanad Éireann. The 15th Seanad was short-lived, and Carroll was not re-appointed in 1982 to the 16th Seanad.

References

Year of birth missing (living people)
Living people
Irish trade union leaders
Labour Party (Ireland) senators
Members of the 15th Seanad
Presidents of the Irish Congress of Trade Unions
Nominated members of Seanad Éireann